Meeking is a surname. Notable people with the surname include:

Antonio Meeking (born 1981), American basketball player
Basil Meeking (1929–2020), New Zealand Roman Catholic bishop
Gordon Meeking (1890–1965), Canadian ice hockey player 
Harry Meeking (1894–1971), Canadian ice hockey player
Lindsay Meeking (1903–1960), Australian rules footballer